In enzymology, a vicianin beta-glucosidase is an enzyme that catalyzes the chemical reaction

(R)-vicianin + H2O  mandelonitrile + vicianose

Thus, the two substrates of this enzyme are (R)-vicianin and H2O, whereas its two products are mandelonitrile and vicianose.

This enzyme belongs to the family of hydrolases, specifically those glycosidases that hydrolyse O- and S-glycosyl compounds.  The systematic name of this enzyme class is (R)-vicianin beta-D-glucohydrolase. This enzyme is also called vicianin hydrolase.

References

 

EC 3.2.1
Enzymes of unknown structure